The 2007–08 season was Fulham F.C.'s seventh consecutive season in the Premier League. Lawrie Sanchez was in charge of the club for the first few months of the season after taking charge at the end of the previous campaign, but left the club by mutual consent in December 2007 after a string of poor results had sent Fulham sliding towards the relegation zone. He was replaced by ex-Finland national team coach Roy Hodgson, who had previously been in charge of fellow Premier League side Blackburn Rovers amongst many other clubs around Europe. Fulham managed to save themselves from relegation to the Championship with a 1–0 away win against Portsmouth at Fratton Park, their third-straight away victory, despite wins for relegation rivals Reading and Birmingham City, staying up on goal difference.

Season review

August
Fulham almost started the season off perfectly when they went ahead against Arsenal through a David Healy goal after one minute during the first weekend of the season, but Arsenal won the game in the last ten minutes with goals from Robin van Persie and Alexander Hleb. Fulham, however, did win their first home match of the season in a midweek match against Bolton Wanderers with goals from Healy and Alexey Smertin (later confirmed as a Gerald Cid own goal), having come from behind after ex-Fulham striker Heiðar Helguson's early goal. It would be several months before Fulham would experience another league victory.

In their third game of the season, Fulham again experienced a turnaround, but this time the scoreline went against them. They were 1–0 up against Middlesbrough – Brian McBride scoring before being carried off injured – but they could not hold on to their lead and lost 2–1. There was controversy about the result because, in the last minute, Healy had a clear goal not given as the referee or linesman could not see that the ball had crossed the line.

The final league game of the month was against Aston Villa; for a fourth game in succession, the team scoring the first goal failed to win. Fulham scored through Healy after six minutes, but two second half goals from former Fulham defender Zat Knight and Shaun Maloney gave Villa the victory.

September
After three agonising defeats in their first four games, Fulham felt that they deserved some luck; this came in the first game of September against Tottenham Hotspur. Younès Kaboul and Dimitar Berbatov had put Tottenham in cruise control with two first goals before Dempsey replied for Fulham just before half-time. Gareth Bale extended Tottenham's lead on 61 minutes to 3–1 but Fulham managed to snatch a draw. Alexey Smertin's 77th-minute goal (also confirmed as an own goal, this time by Ricardo Rocha) and Diomansy Kamara's bicycle kick in stoppage time gave Fulham a 3–3 draw.

In the next game, away to Wigan Athletic, it was the opposition that rescued the game late on. Dempsey gave Fulham the lead but Jason Koumas scored a penalty 10 minutes from time after Bouazza's foul on Mario Melchiot to give Wigan a point. Another two draws followed in September: firstly a 3–3 draw against Manchester City, throwing away a lead twice before having to eventually come from behind (Hameur Bouazza, Simon Davies and Danny Murphy scoring for Fulham, with the City goals coming from Martin Petrov and Émile Mpenza). They followed that up by holding Chelsea to a 0–0 at Stamford Bridge.

In the League Cup, Fulham suffered a 2–1 home defeat to Bolton.

October
Fulham started October with a home defeat against Portsmouth, through deflected strikes by Benjani and Hermann Hreiðarsson. A week later, against Derby County, Fulham had their second goalless draw of the season in a game of few chances, although in truth Derby could have snatched the win.

The final game of the month saw Fulham throw away yet another lead with a 1–1 draw against Sunderland. Simon Davies gave Fulham the lead in the first half and they held out until the 86th minute, when Kenwyne Jones was in the right place to score an equaliser for Sunderland.

November
Fulham started November with a 3–1 home victory against Reading. Simon Davies put Fulham in front after 18 minutes. Kevin Doyle equalised ten minutes after the break, but Fulham struck back with goals from Clint Dempsey and David Healy. Elliott Omozusi was sent off in injury time, in only his second appearance, for a second yellow card. Fulham were unlucky to lose in their next game away at Liverpool as Fernando Torres and Steven Gerrard both scored in the last ten minutes for a 2–0 victory. It was very harsh on Fulham, who had resisted the Liverpool pressure for the majority of the game.

After the international break, Fulham drew 2–2 with Blackburn Rovers, having twice been in front through goals from Danny Murphy and Diomansy Kamara, only to be pegged back by Brett Emerton and Stephen Warnock.

December
December was a busy month, with matches crammed together at the end of the month. It turned out to be a very unsuccessful period for Fulham, as they took just two points from a possible 18.

January
A very bad start to the new year saw Fulham defeated by close rivals Chelsea 2–1 at Craven Cottage.

February

March

April
April started with a 3–1 defeat at home against Sunderland with second half goals from Danny Collins, Michael Chopra and Kenwyne Jones, even though Fulham had equalised through a brilliant David Healy goal from 30 yards out. Things improved the next week though as Fulham finally recorded their first away win since beating Newcastle United in September 2006, against Reading at the Madejski Stadium. Brian McBride and Erik Nevland scored the goals. It came as some relief to the long-suffering away support and put Fulham's survival bid back on track. However, Fulham then suffered a home defeat against an under-strength Liverpool side, Jermaine Pennant and Peter Crouch scoring for Liverpool. This defeat meant for most Fulham fans that relegation was looking almost certain; if results would not go their way the following week, then they could be relegated.

The following week, Fulham gained a priceless three points away to Manchester City to record their second successive away victory. After falling behind 2–0 in the first half, Fulham fought back from mathematical relegation to score three goals in the last twenty minutes, culminating with a 92nd-minute goal by Diomansy Kamara, his second of the game.

May
On 3 May, Fulham were able to pull themselves out of the drop zone as Reading lost to Tottenham, and Fulham earned a vital three points with a win against Birmingham, one point above Fulham in the league table. This sent Birmingham to 19th position and Reading to 18th position, as Fulham leapfrogged both to 17th position on goal difference. Fulham's Premier League survival was in their own hands going into the last game of the season; both Reading and Birmingham registered big wins, but Fulham survived on goal difference with a 1–0 victory away to Portsmouth.

Players

First-team squad

Left club during season

Transfers

Summer

In

Out

Winter

In

Out on loan

Club

Management

Other information

Competitions

Overall

Premier League

Table

Results summary

Results by round

Matches

Pre-season

Premier League

League Cup

FA Cup

Squad statistics

Updated 5 May 2008
 * Player is out on loan
 ** Player has left club

References

Notes

External links
 Fulham FC official website
 2007-08 statistics on Soccerbase

Fulham F.C. seasons
Ful